Governor Hopkins may refer to:

Stephen Hopkins (politician) (1707–1785), 28th, 30th, 32nd, and 34th Governor of the Colony of Rhode Island and Providence Plantations between 1755 and 1768
Edward Hopkins (1600–1657), Governor of the Connecticut Colony from 1640 to 1655